was the founder of Acom, a major consumer loan company in Japan. Kyosuke Kinoshita, the current chairman of the company, is his eldest son. Kinoshita was a native of Akashi, Hyogo.

External links
Reference to the "late Masao Kinoshita"

1910 births
Year of death missing
20th-century Japanese businesspeople